Rev. Hamnet Holditch, also spelled Hamnett Holditch (1800 – 12 December 1867), was an English mathematician who was President of Gonville and Caius College, Cambridge. In 1858, he introduced the result in geometry now known as Holditch's theorem.

Hamnet Holditch was born in 1800 in King's Lynn, the son of George Holditch, pilot and harbour-master. Educated at King's Lynn Grammar School under Rev. Martin Coulcher, he matriculated at Gonville and Caius College, Cambridge in 1818, and graduated B.A. in 1822 (Senior Wrangler and 1st Smith's Prize), M.A. in 1825.

At Gonville and Caius College, Holditch was a junior fellow fron 1821 and a senior fellow from 1823, and held the college posts of lecturer in Hebrew and Greek, registrar, steward, salarist (1823–28), bursar (1828–31), and President (1835–67).

He died at Gonville and Caius College on 12 December 1867, aged 67, and was buried at North Wootton.

Although Holditch produced ten mathematical papers, he was extremely idle as a tutor. John Venn, an undergraduate at Caius in the 1850s then a Caius Fellow from 1857, noted that Holditch, despite his succession of college offices, "beyond a few private pupils, never took part in educational work":

He was the only son of George Holditch, and had two sisters.

Bibliography
Rev. Hamnett Holditch, "Concise Demonstration of the Property of the Parabola", The London and Edinburgh Philosophical Magazine and Journal of Science, vol. 10, 1837, pp. 35–36. (Google Books)
Hamnett Holditch, "On Rolling Curves", Transactions of the Cambridge Philosophical Society, vol. 7, (1842), pp. 61–86. (Google Books)
Rev. H. Holditch, "On Small Finite Oscillations", Transactions of the Cambridge Philosophical Society, Volume the Eighth, Cambridge, 1849, pp. 89–104. (Google Books)
Rev. Hamnet Holditch, "On the Caustic by Reflection from a Spherical Surface", The Quarterly Journal of Pure and Applied Mathematics, vol. 1, London, 1857, pp. 93–111. (Google Books)
Rev. Hamnet Holditch, "Geometrical Theorem", The Quarterly Journal of Pure and Applied Mathematics, vol. 2, London, 1858, p. 38. (Google Books; Internet Archive)
Rev. Hamnet Holditch, "On the nth Caustic, by Reflexion from a Circle", The Quarterly Journal of Pure and Applied Mathematics, vol. 2, London, 1858, pp. 301–322. (Google Books)
Rev. Hamnet Holditch, "On the nth Evolutes and Involutes of Curves", The Quarterly Journal of Pure and Applied Mathematics, vol. 3, London, 1860, pp. 236–246. (Google Books)
Rev. Hamnet Holditch, "Theorems on Related Curves", The Quarterly Journal of Pure and Applied Mathematics, vol. 3, London, 1860, pp. 271–274. (Google Books)
Rev. Hamnet Holditch, "On Double Tangents", The Quarterly Journal of Pure and Applied Mathematics, vol. 4, London, 1861, pp. 28–44. (Google Books)
Rev. Hamnet Holditch, "On a Magic Square", The Quarterly Journal of Pure and Applied Mathematics, vol. 6, London, 1864, pp. 181–189. (Google Books)

References

The Last Will and Testament  of Hamnet Holditch

1800 births
1867 deaths
Senior Wranglers
Fellows of Gonville and Caius College, Cambridge
Geometers
19th-century English mathematicians